Bayshore Mall is an indoor shopping mall in Eureka, California. It is named for its close proximity to Humboldt Bay. The large shopping facility is the only major mall located on the coast north of the San Francisco Bay Area, securing Eureka as the trading center for the entire far North Coast.

History
The mall was built in 1988 as demand for shopping grew in the North Coast Region of California. The original anchors were Mervyn's on the south end, Gottschalks on the west end, JCPenney on the east end, and Sears on the north end. Longs Drugs also operated a store at the mall, which was closed (having been relocated to the PayLess store purchased by Longs at the Eureka Mall nearby) and most of that space was converted to Petco in 2004.

In the early 2000s, JCPenney downsized into an outlet store, then left the mall entirely. Bed, Bath, and Beyond, along with Borders Books, came in soon after and split the anchor space. Then, in late 2008, Mervyn's filed for Chapter 11 Bankruptcy, and in turn, closed their Eureka store in December of that year. Gottschalks closed in July 2009, after filing Chapter 11 Bankruptcy, leaving just one anchor space filled. Kohl's officially opened up their new store at the old Mervyn's location on September 27, 2009. Old Navy and the Gap closed before The Movies, a branch of a local cinema entertainment company with other sites scattered over the region, closed in December 2009. Borders Books closed in September 2011 following bankruptcy. Following the purchase, plans to remodel the 73,000 square foot Gottschalks space were submitted to the City of Eureka by a contractor for Walmart during the summer of 2011, and opened June 12, 2012.

Hometown Buffet closed on December 31, 2011. In late summer of 2013, TJ Maxx went into the mall where Borders had been. The same year ULTA Beauty and Sports Authority went where The Movies had been, and in 2014, Sbarro closed amid bankruptcy issues, while Ms. Clothing, a value clothing store, came in while Staples went into the mall where Hometown Buffet had been in September 2015. The Avenue and Wet Seal closed in January 2015, though Avenue never showed signs of a closeout or going out of business sign. A localized pizza place entered the mall in January 2015 in the former Sbarro's spot, later to be known as Hot Slice Pizzeria, with a clothes store, Salt Tree, going in a vacant lot (but leaving just a few weeks later along with long-time tenant RadioShack). Planet Fitness opened later in the year (though it was delayed until early 2016) where the half of Hometown Buffet had been. June 2016 saw Sports Authority close after just three years due to the company going bankrupt. In March 2017, Hot Slice Pizzeria closed, with a Mexican restaurant opening just a few weeks later in the same place.

June 29, 2019 saw the return of Old Navy, going where Sports Authority had been, after leaving the mall in 2019.

2010 Eureka earthquake
On January 9, 2010, a 6.5 earthquake struck off the coast of Eureka, about 27 miles out at sea, at 4:27 pm. The mall was among the buildings damaged by the quake, with loosened floor and ceiling tiles, as well as water damage from the sprinklers, but engineers found no structural damage.

Bayshore Mall today
Currently, the Bayshore mall has over 60 stores and is the largest shopping complex for over 200 miles. Anchor stores are Kohl's, and Walmart, which opened June 13, 2012, and TJ Maxx, which opened August 25, 2013. ULTA Beauty and Sports Authority opened in 2013, but Sports Authority declared Chapter 11 Bankruptcy in 2016. Old Navy returned to the mall in 2019, occupying the old Sports Authority space. Ray's Food Place, a full-service supermarket, was located in a separate building directly south of the Kohls entrance on the same property, but closed at the end of 2013 when parent company C&K Markets declared Chapter 11 Bankruptcy. Other major stores include Ross Dress for Less, Bed Bath & Beyond, and Petco. The mall is served by the Eureka Transit Service and Redwood Transit Service. 

On August 31, 2019, it was announced that Sears would be closing this location a part of a plan to close 85 stores nationwide. The store closed on December 1, 2019. 

In January 2020, Pier 1 Imports announced it would close this location as part of a plan to close over 400 locations nationwide.

References

Brookfield Properties
Shopping malls established in 1988
Shopping malls in Humboldt County, California
Buildings and structures in Eureka, California
Tourist attractions in Eureka, California
1988 establishments in California